Focal-JMlab is a French company that has been designing and selling high fidelity audio systems since 1979. Based in Saint-Étienne, the company manufactures loudspeakers for the home, speaker drivers for automobiles, headphones, and professional monitor loudspeakers.

The Grande Utopia is the brand's emblematic loudspeaker, which earned the company its worldwide reputation. It is considered one of the best high-fidelity loudspeakers in the world.

Focal's industrial strategy concentrates on having full control over the entire production process, from the design and manufacturing of the speaker drivers to the assembly of the final product. Its products are entirely designed and developed in France, and most of the production is carried out at the factory in Saint-Étienne (France).

Focal-JMlab generates a €53 million annual turnover and employs about 230 people at its facility in Saint-Étienne, which groups the production, R&D and management departments at the same site. Its export share is 70%.

History

1980s 
Focal-JMlab, a research office dedicated to acoustics was founded in 1979 in Paris by engineer, high-fidelity enthusiast and technology journalist Jacques Mahul. He began making his first speaker drivers in a small workshop in Saint-Etienne, at a precision mechanics company, which belonged to his father. Whilst producing his speaker drivers, Jacques Mahul also launched his own range of loudspeakers under the brand JMlab. His first loudspeaker, the DB13, was a bookshelf loudspeaker, which produced volumes comparable to larger loudspeakers, particularly in bass frequencies. Initially, he only sold his product to acquaintances but the DB13 was soon launched on the market.

In the 1980s, the two brands became established. Focal focused on innovation, producing specialised products such as the polyglass "V" cone and polykevlar cone. The materials used on the tweeter evolved from glass fibres to Kevlar, producing a more linear frequency response curve and a smoother and less piercing treble.
As for JMlab, the company went from being a manufacturer of small-and medium-sized loudspeakers to a manufacturer of veritable high-end models.

1990s 
Things rapidly began to pick up speed in 1990 with the arrival of Gérard Chrétien, another high end high fidelity enthusiast and editor-in-chief of the magazine L’Audiophile since 1977. Currently, he is the managing director and marketing director of Focal-JMlab. By adapting the company's products to the demands of the consumer, the brand soon earned its role as leader on the French loudspeaker market. The company's turnover increased from €9 million in 1992 to €26 million in 2000.

It was also in the early 1990s that the company implemented an export strategy for its loudspeakers across Europe, Southeast Asia and North America. The brand's reputation on the international stage was reinforced by various awards. The JMlab Vega model was voted "Loudspeaker of the Year, 1992" in Japan and in 1996, the Grande Utopia model was praised by the international press.

2000s 
From 2002, production was relocated in Saint-Etienne where about three-quarters of production still takes place with the aim of equipping every loudspeaker with "Made in France" speaker drivers.

In 2003, the two brands were incorporated under the name Focal-JMlab for home products, before being renamed as just Focal in 2005 for all product sectors.

2003 was also the year that the company began collaborating with Paris-based design agency Pineau & Le Porcher. By combining sound quality and aesthetics, this move made Focal-JMlab products lifestyle loudspeakers in their own right and also gave the company a brand signature. Thus, Focal and Pineau & Le Porcher worked in close collaboration to come up with a completely new design for various ranges: Profile and Electra (2005), Chorus (2006), Utopia (2008) and Dome (2009).

In 2007, the company bought up the Guy HF cabinet-making facility located in Bourbon-Lancy, Saône-et-Loire.

2010s 
In 2011, Focal-JMlab merged with Naim Audio Limited, the leading high-end electronics brand in the UK, which mainly designs and manufactures audio electronics. The new holding company, Vervent Audio Group, owns and manages the two brands. However, both brands remain independent with their own specific philosophies and their own respective ranges and products.

The two companies began consolidating their activities in 2013, with their presence on a common stand at the High End Show in Munich.

In 2011, Focal adopted a new visual identity and finally, in 2012, built a showroom and a new auditorium at its site in Saint-Étienne.

In 2014, Focal&Naim Group was taken over by its management team, Naxicap Partners (major shareholder), Aquasourca and Garibaldi Participations. Jacques Mahul remains involved and becomes Focal-JMlab Vice-Président. The same year, Focal is recognized by the French state thanks to The Entreprise du Patrimoine Vivant (Living Heritage Company) label. A label delivered under the authority of the French Minister for Economy, Finances and Industry rewarding French firms for the excellence of their traditional and industrial skills.

In 2015, Guy HF cabinet-making becomes Focal Ebénisterie Bourgogne.

Technologies 
Focal-JMlab maintains a regular research and development program in speaker drivers’ technologies. Investments in this field have enabled the company to conceive various innovative concepts. Ten innovations have been patented to date.

Inverted dome tweeter (1981) 
An inverted dome tweeter was designed and developed by Focal in 1981. (Inverted dome tweeters appeared at least as early as the late 1960s in the EPI 100 loudspeaker manufactured by EPI/Epicure. It had an inverted fabric dome.) One of its main advantages is its low directionality and its high dynamics. The majority of the brand's tweeters still feature this technology.

K2 cone (1986) 
In 1986, the company introduced the Polykevlar sandwich structure. The Poly-K cone is composed of two layers of aramid fibres applied to either side of a hollow-micro-ball structure in order to improve the compromise between weight-rigidity-and damping.

Polyglass cone (1988) 
Polyglass technology was introduced by Focal in 1988. This consists in depositing fine glass micro-balls on the surface of a cellulose pulp cone (paper). This combination of glass and paper results in a very rigid material with a low mass, providing excellent damping qualities. The Polyglass cone resulted in a very linear frequency response curve and improved the definition of the midrange.

"W" sandwich cone (1995) 
In 1995, Focal improved its sandwich concept with its "W" cone system which consists of two sheets of glass fibres applied to a structural foam core. Unlike the mono-material cones, the "W" sandwich cone optimises the frequency response curve by maximising the mass, rigidity and damping.

Beryllium tweeter (2002) 
In 2002, Focal launched another innovation to their product line, the Beryllium Tweeter, which was only the second time a tweeter had ever been manufactured from Beryllium. Yamaha had introduced the Beryllium tweeter and Beryllium mid-range speaker in the NS-1000 back in 1974.

Beryllium is seven times more rigid than titanium (six times more rigid than aluminum), but has the same mass. It enabled Focal to develop a lighter and faster tweeter which provides excellent damping qualities. When associated with the inverted dome concept, the frequency response can be increased to 40 kHz, and more than 5 octaves can be spanned.
Costing only 2% that than gold, Focal only uses the Beryllium Tweeter for the Premium ranges: Utopia, Sopra, Electra and high end studio monitors.

Tweeter Al-Mg (2007) 
This tweeter was introduced by Focal JMlab in 2007. The use of aluminium increases damping qualities, whereas the use of magnesium increases the rigidity of the dome. This enabled the frequency response of the Al-Mg Tweeter to be increased to 28 kHz.
The Al-Mg Tweeter is used on the Chorus range of the Home line and on the CMS and Shape ranges of the Pro line, among others.

Flax membrane cone (2013) 
Eighteen years after introducing the "W" sandwich cones, Focal launched the new Made in France "F" Sandwich cone (for Flax). Composed of flax fibres enclosed in two thin layers of glass fibre, this solution offers a natural sound without colouration thanks to light, rigid and damped cones.

Tuned mass damper (2015) 
In order to control resonance and to reduce medium speaker driver distortions, the Tuned Mass Damper technology consists of an additional mass that oscillates in opposition to the resonance frequency. The suspension is optimised to avoid distortions and increase the definition.

Infinite horn loading system (2015) 
The rear of the Beryllium tweeter is loaded via a small cavity which is connected to the exterior of the enclosure by a horn. The inside is filled with a damping material. Rear wave of the tweeter is gradually absorbed to reduce distortion.

M-shaped inverted dome tweeter (2016) 
Tweeters from the K2 Power, renewed in 2016, feature this M-shaped profile. This shape enables to extend the frequency response, a smoother diffusion, and more detailed treble.

M-profile cone (2018) 
Utopia M speaker drivers (range launched in 2018) feature a M-profile cone which combines rigidity, damping and lightness for more linear frequency response, reduced harmonic distortion and better sound dispersion.

Slatefiber cone (2019) 
Developed with the Chora range, the Slatefiber cone is a membrane composed of recycled non-woven carbon fibres and thermoplastic polymer. Made in France at Focal, this "slate effect" cone provides a dynamic and rich sound.

Products 
Focal-JMlab has organised its range of products into five universes: the Home line, the Car line, the Pro line for music industry professionals, the Headphones line since 2012 and finally the Integration line (public address sound systems)

The Home loudspeakers universe represents 59% of the company turnover and is divided into two collections:
 Classic: all the loudspeakers of this collection are designed, developed and manufactured in France and combine all the Focal technological innovations (inverted dome tweeter, « W » and « F » sandwich con, etc.). Among the principal products, there are the Utopia, Sopra, Electra, Aria, Chorus, Kanta and more recently Chora lines. In 2013, launches Easya, high-fidelity wireless loudspeakers connectable with multiple sources thanks to built-in Bluetooth® aptX® technology.

The Grande Utopia is the collection's emblematic loudspeaker. The first generation of the Grande Utopia, born in 1995, is a condensation of all the expertise and experience that Focal had gained since its creation. The second generation, in 2002, had the particularity of featuring pure Beryllium dome tweeters which enable it to receive, the year after, the "Golden Sound" award in Japan. The third generation, launched in 2008, was a concentration of the best of Focal technologies. Designed by Pineau & Le Porcher, The Grande Utopia EM distinguished itself through its extraordinary dimensions: weighing 570 lbs (260 kg) and standing over 6 ft (2m) high. The cabinets can be customised at the cabinet-making facility in Bourbon-Lancy which is in charge of manufacturing and finishing the cabinets. In 2018, Focal unveiled Grande Utopia EM Evo and Stella Utopia EM Evo, which feature the latest technology of the brand.

 New Media: Since 2008, with the arrival of the Dôme miniature loudspeaker (available with Flax cone since 2014), Focal has adapted its know-how to new modes of music consumption with compact loudspeakers, "Plug and Play", multimedia and more recently wireless (XS Book Wireless in 2013). In 2013, Focal launched 5.1 Home Cinema Packs in the New Media collection. Since May 2014, Focal entered the soundbar market launching Dimension, a 5.1 soundbar which, associated with its subwoofer, can be used as a sound plate for a flat screen.
The Sib line evolved in 2017 and became Sib Evo featuring Dolby Atmos technology.

At the end of the 1980s the Car Audio department was born and the first car audio products were launched. In 2010, the Car Audio division has been reorganized into three ranges and represents now 30% of the turnover.
 Elite : manufactured in France, the Utopia Be and K2 Power kits enable made-to-measure installations. It is the high-end range of the Focal Car Audio offering. In June 2014, Focal launches the made in France, handmade high-end Ultima kit. This concentrates Focal technologies used in the Grande Utopia EM speaker and in the SM9 monitoring speaker. End of 2018, the Utopia M line joins the Elite range with a new "à la carte" concept which enables to customers to configure their own system.
 Performance : products of this range offer the possibility of creating your own installation thanks to the technical solutions of the Expert, Access and Auditor lines.
 Intégration : This range offers simple and quick to install products, particularly "Plug & Play" kits intended for improving some brands’ original acoustic (BMW, Peugeot 207 and Golf 6, Renault and Toyota) but also the Universal line where each system has a reduced volume and is easy to install.

In 2002, a professional department, "Focal Professional" has been created, offering studio monitors dedicated to recording studios. The range is composed of five lines: SM9, SM6, CMS, Shape and Alpha to which the Listen professional and Clear Professional headphones designed for sound professionals (sound engineers and musicians) were added in 2018. The range now represents 11% of the company turnover.

Since 2007, Focal have offered invisible sound systems, In-Wall and In-Ceiling, in order to add sound to public and private places. In 2018, the brand presents 100 Series and 300 Series which include Outdoor loudspeakers

Finally, in 2012, Focal expanded into commercializing its first nomad headphone, Spirit One which is replaced by Spirit One S model two years later. The range is completed in 2013 with the Spirit Classic, a headphone intended for a use at home and Spirit Professional. In 2015, Focal launches its very first in-ear headphones named Sphear.
In 2016, Focal launches two Made in France high-end headphones hand made in their factory, Elear ad Utopia. Then, in 2017, the Collection is completed with Clear headphones

Then, in 2017 marks the arrival of a complete line of mobile wired or wireless headphones. 5 models are now available: Listen, Listen Wireless, Spark, Spark Wireless and Sphear S.
Focal launches its very first Made in France high-end closed-back headphones in 2018 with Elegia followed by Stellia in 2018 and a DAC and amplifier for headphones named Arche.

Partnerships

Automotive partnerships
In 2016 and 2017, Focal collaborated with several French car manufacturers to equip production vehicles. First vehicle Peugeot 3008 SUV, 5008 SUV,508 and SUV 2008 then DS7 Crossback and DS3 Crossback by DS Automobiles and finally the rebirth of the Alpine brand with the A110.
Focal also participates in several concept cars of these brands such as E-Tense, X E-Tense, E-Legend, etc.

Tournaire
For the launch of its first high-end Made in France headphones, Focal introduced a piece of collection in collaboration with Tournaire jeweler. The Utopia headphones have been customized with the mark of the Trilogy, the symbol of Tournaire jewelers. They are made of 18-karat gold mounted with diamonds. Available in 8 pieces only.

Ubisoft
In September 2017, Focal signed a partnership with Ubisoft, French video games publisher. For the release of Assassin's Creed Origins game, Focal launched 2 headphones in limited editions: Listen Wireless and Utopia by Tournaire.

Figures 

Focal-JMlab's turnover for 2016 was €53 million, 70% of which came from exports.

Distribution of turnover per continent in 2012:
 Europe : 57%
 America : 20%
 Middle East and Africa:  2,5%
 Asia/Oceania:  20,5%

The Focal brand is distributed in more than 160 countries worldwide.
 
Focal-JMlab employs more than 230 people at its 187,292 ft2 (17,400m2) facility in Saint-Étienne, which regroups the production, R&D and management departments at the same site.

Vervent Audio Group posted a turnover of €110 million in 2019 and employed 430 people at that point.

See also 
 List of studio monitor manufacturers

References

External links

 

Audio equipment manufacturers of France
Loudspeaker manufacturers
Electronics companies established in 1979
French brands
1979 establishments in France
Companies based in Auvergne-Rhône-Alpes